The ancient Roman units of measurement were primarily founded on the Hellenic system, which in turn was influenced by the Egyptian system and the Mesopotamian system. The Roman units were comparatively consistent and well documented.

Length
The basic unit of Roman linear measurement was the pes or Roman foot (plural: pedes). Investigation of its relation to the English foot goes back at least to 1647, when John Greaves published his Discourse on the Romane foot. Greaves visited Rome in 1639, and measured, among other things, the foot measure on the tomb of Titus Statilius Aper, that on the statue of Cossutius formerly in the gardens of Angelo Colocci, the congius of Vespasian previously measured by Villalpandus, a number of brass measuring-rods found in the ruins of Rome, the paving-stones of the Pantheon and many other ancient Roman buildings, and the distance between the milestones on the Appian Way. He concluded that the Cossutian foot was the "true" Roman foot, and reported these values compared to the iron standard of the English foot in the Guildhall in London

Smith (1851) gives a value of 0.9708 English feet, or about 295.9 mm. An accepted modern value is 296 mm.

The Roman foot was sub-divided either like the Greek pous into 16 digiti or fingers; or into 12 unciae or inches. Frontinus writes in the 1st century AD that the digitus was used in Campania and most parts of Italy. The principal Roman units of length were:

Other units include the schoenus (from the Greek for "rush rope") used for the distances in Isidore of Charax's Parthian Stations (where it had a value around ) and in the name of the Nubian land of Triacontaschoenus between the First and Second Cataracts on the Nile (where it had a value closer to ).

Area

The ordinary units of measurement of area were:

Other units of area described by Columella in his De Re Rustica include the porca of 180 × 30 Roman feet (about ) used in Hispania Baetica and the Gallic candetum or cadetum of 100 feet in the city or 150 in the country. Columella also gives uncial divisions of the jugerum, tabulated by the anonymous translator of the 1745 Millar edition as follows:

Volume

Both liquid and dry volume measurements were based on the sextarius.

Archaeologically, however, the evidence is not as precise.

The core volume units are:
 amphora quadrantal (Roman jar) – one cubic pes (Roman foot)
 congius – a half-pes cube (thus  amphora quadrantal)
 sextarius – literally  of a congius

Liquid measure

Dry measure

Weight

The units of weight or mass were mostly based on factors of 12. Several of the unit names were also the names of coins during the Roman Republic and had the same fractional value of a larger base unit: libra for weight and as for coin. The as was reduced from 12 ounces to 2 after the First Punic War, to 1 during the Second Punic War, and to half an ounce by the 131 BC Lex Papiria.

The divisions of the libra were:

The subdivisions of the uncia were:

Time

Years
The complicated Roman calendar was replaced by the Julian calendar in 45 BC. In the Julian calendar, an ordinary year is 365 days long, and a leap year is 366 days long. Between 45 BC and AD 1, leap years occurred at irregular intervals. Starting in AD 4, leap years occurred regularly every four years. Year numbers were rarely used; rather, the year was specified by naming the Roman consuls for that year. (As consuls' terms latterly ran from January to December, this eventually caused January, rather than March, to be considered the start of the year.) When a year number was required, the Greek Olympiads were used, or the count of years since the founding of Rome, "ab urbe condita" in 753 BC. In the Middle Ages, the year numbering was changed to the Anno Domini count.

The calendar used in most of the modern world, the Gregorian calendar, differs from the Julian calendar in that it skips three leap years every four centuries to more closely approximate the length of the tropical year.

Weeks

Each astrological day was reckoned to begin at sunrise. The Jews also use a seven-day week, which began Saturday evening. The seventh day of the week they called Sabbath; the other days they numbered rather than named, except for Friday, which could be called either the Parasceve or the sixth day. Each Jewish day begins at sunset. In 321, Constantine the Great gave his subjects every Sunday off in honor of his family's tutelary deity, the Unconquered Sun, thus cementing the seven-day week into Roman civil society.

Hours

The Romans divided the daytime into twelve horae or hours starting at sunrise and ending at sunset. The night was divided into four watches. The duration of these hours varied with seasons; in the winter, when the daylight period was shorter, its 12 hours were correspondingly shorter and its four watches were correspondingly longer.

Astrologers divided the solar day into 24 equal hours, and these astrological hours became the basis for medieval clocks and our modern 24-hour mean solar day.

Unicode

A number of special symbols for Roman currency were added to the Unicode Standard version 5.1 (April 2008) as the Ancient Symbols block (U+10190–U+101CF, in the Supplementary Multilingual Plane ).

As mentioned above, the names for divisions of an  coin (originally one libra of bronze) were also used for divisions of a libra, and the symbols U+10190–U+10195 are likewise also symbols for weights:
 U+10190 (𐆐): Sextans
 U+10191 (𐆑): Uncia
 U+10192 (𐆒): Semuncia
 U+10193 (𐆓): Sextula
 U+10194 (𐆔): Semisextula
 U+10195 (𐆕): Siliqua

See also
 Ancient Egyptian units
 Ancient Greek units
 Biblical and Talmudic units of measurement
 Byzantine units
 History of measurement

References

External links
 Proposal to Add Ancient Roman Weights and Monetary Signs to UCS (Universal Character Set)